The list of ship launches in 1991 includes a chronological list of all ships launched in 1991.


References

1991
Ship launches